Military Trail is a  long six-lane north–south arterial road in Broward and Palm Beach counties in South Florida. A portion of the road is designated State Road 809 (SR 809), but most of the road within Palm Beach County is locally maintained and signed as County Road 809 (CR 809), while the Broward County section exists without either designation.

Military Trail, like the paralleling Congress Avenue and Jog and Powerline Roads, is a popular commuting alternative to often-congested Interstate 95 (I-95), Florida's Turnpike, and U.S. Route 1 (US 1) in both counties.

The state-maintained segment currently begins at an intersection with Lake Worth Road (SR 802) in Greenacres and terminates at PGA Boulevard (SR 786) in Palm Beach Gardens. CR 809 exists in two sections––between PGA Boulevard and Jupiter and between Lake Worth Road and the Broward County line. These sections of Military Trail were part of SR 809 until 2004, when the state route was truncated, although there is seldom signage for the county road.

Route description

Broward County

Military Trail is an continuation of Andrews Avenue Extension, which itself is a continuation of Andrews Avenue (CR 811A) built in the 2000s. At an intersection with Sample Road (SR 834), Andrews Avenue transitions to Military Trail. For the first , the road is cosigned as Northwest 9th Avenue in the Deerfield Beach numbering system, before jogging to the east and intersecting Southwest 10th Street, which is an eastward extension of the Sawgrass Expressway (SR 869. Shortly after crossing Hillsboro Boulevard (SR 810), Military Trail bridges the Hillsboro Canal and enters Palm Beach County.

Although this segment of Military Road is unnumbered, it is maintained by the City of Deerfield Beach from Northwest 54th Street to Hillsboro Boulevard and county-maintained elsewhere.

Palm Beach County
The southern segment of CR 809 begins at the Hillsboro Canal Bridge in Boca Raton. Military Trail intersects Palmetto Park Road (CR 798), but not Glades Road (SR 808) due to an elevation change. Glades passes over Military Trail due to it being very close to the Tri-Rail tracks and Interstate 95, so access is provided by nearby service roads, which also serve the Boca Town Center. Military Trail also intersects Yamato Road in Boca, which exists east of CR 809 as SR 794 and west as CR 794. Still in Boca, Military Trail also intersects Clint Moore Road. As it enters Delray Beach, Military connects with Linton Boulevard (CR 782) and West Atlantic Avenue (SR 806), which provides access to downtown Delray. In Boynton Beach, the road intersects Woolbright Road (CR 792), Boynton Beach Boulevard (SR 804), and Gateway Boulevard. In Delray and Boynton, Military Trail also provides access to the many country clubs located off the road. In Greenacres, Military Trail intersects with Lake Worth Road (SR 802) and CR 809 transitions to SR 809.

SR 809 begins at the intersection of Military Trail and Lake Worth Road. SR 809 intersects Southern Boulevard (US 98 and SR 80) in a diamond interchange. For the next mile, SR 809 acts as the western border of Palm Beach International Airport, until intersecting with Belvedere Road. One mile north of the northern end of the airport, it intersects Okeechobee Boulevard (SR 704), a major intersection in the city. Continuing north, Military Trail passes by Northwood University to the east, and north of Community Drive, SR 809 becomes a service road for housing developments.  Following an intersection with 45th Street (CR 702), SR 809 leaves West Palm Beach and enters Riviera Beach. There, it intersects with the Bee Line Highway (SR 710) and Blue Heron Boulevard (SR 708) at the outskirts of the West Palm Beach VA Medical Center. Continuing into Palm Beach Gardens, SR 809 ends at PGA Boulevard (SR 786).

At PGA Boulevard, SR 809 terminates and Military Trail once again becomes CR 809.

History

With the exception of the section between Lake Worth Road and PGA Boulevard, the road was converted to a county road in 2004.

Military Trail is named for the trail blazed by U.S. Army Tennessee and Missouri Volunteer forces, from a Fort in Jupiter, south to a Fort in Fort Lauderdale during the Second Seminole War.

Major intersections

See also

References

External links

809
809
809
Historic trails and roads in Florida